Eiichiro Azuma (born 27 September 1966) is a Japanese-born American historian, writer, and professor. He has served as a Professor of History and Asian American Studies at the University of Pennsylvania. The focus of his work is Japanese Americans in relationship to migration, Japanese colonialism, and U.S. and Japan relations.

Biography 
Eiichiro Azuma was born 27 September 1966 in Tokyo, Japan. He graduated from University of California at Los Angeles with an M.A. degree in Asian American Studies (1992), and a Ph.D. in history (2000).

He has taught at the University of Pennsylvania since January 2001. Starting in fall 2009, he held the position of Alan Charles Kors Endowed Term Chair in history. Azuma served as the director of the Asian American Studies Program at the University of Pennsylvania from 2013 through 2018.

His work appeared in the Journal of American History, Journal of Asian Studies, Pacific Historical Review and Journal of American-East Asian Relations, Reviews in American History. He is co-editor of the Asian American Studies book series at the University of Illinois Press."

Awards 
 2006 Frederick Jackson Turner Award Honorable Mention by the Organization of American Historians, for Between Two Empires
 2008–2009, he was also a recipient of the Donald D. Harrington Faculty Fellowship from the University of Texas, Austin
 2020 John K. Fairbanks Prize in East Asian history, from the American Historical Association, for his work In Search of Our Frontier
 Theodore Saloutos Award from the Immigration and Ethnic History Society, for Between Two Empires
 History Book Award from the Association for Asian American Studies, for Between Two Empires
 Hiroshi Shimizu book prize from the Japanese Association of American Studies, for Between Two Empires
 History Book Award Honorable Mention from the Association for Asian American Studies, for Before Internment

Publications

Books

References

1966 births
Living people
University of California, Los Angeles alumni
University of Pennsylvania faculty
University of Pennsylvania historian
21st-century American historians
21st-century American male writers
American male non-fiction writers